The Canton of Rémuzat is a former canton located in the Department of Drôme, in the Arrondissement of Nyons. It had 1,391 inhabitants (2012). It was disbanded following the French canton reorganisation which came into effect in March 2015. It consisted of 16 communes, which joined the canton of Nyons et Baronnies in 2015.

Composition 
It was composed of the following communes:

 La Charce
 Chauvac-Laux-Montaux
 Cornillac
 Cornillon-sur-l'Oule
 Lemps
 Montferrand-la-Fare
 Montréal-les-Sources
 Pelonne
 Le Poët-Sigillat
 Pommerol
 Rémuzat (chef-lieu)
 Roussieux
 Sahune
 Saint-May
 Verclause
 Villeperdrix

Political history
1955-1967	M. Rolland	Centrist then DVD	
1967-1979	M. Latil	DVD	
1979-2004	Jean Besson	Socialist	Senator of the Drôme since 1989
2004-2014	Hervé Rasclard	Socialist	Deputy mayor of Bourg-de-Péage, Premier Vice-President of the General Council

See also
Cantons of the Drôme department

References

Former cantons of Drôme
2015 disestablishments in France
States and territories disestablished in 2015